The Union Party (also translated Unionist Party) is a conservative-liberal, agrarian political party on the Faroe Islands. The party wants to maintain the Faroe Islands' union with Denmark. On 24 October 2015 Bárður á Steig Nielsen succeeded Kaj Leo Johannesen as party leader.

In the elections in 2008, the party won 21.0% of the popular vote and 7 out of 33 seats. After having been in the opposition for a short interval after the elections, the Union Party formed a new government in September 2008, and Kaj Leo Johannesen became prime minister.

In the Danish parliamentary elections of 2007, the party received 23.5% of the Faroese vote, thereby gaining one of the two Faroese seats in the national legislature of Denmark.

At the general elections in 2011 the party gained 24.7% of the votes and 8 seats out of 33. However, on 10 February 2014 the party gained one more seat in the Løgting, after Gerhard Lognberg who was elected to the parliament representing the Social Democratic Party, joined the Union Party. This happened three months after Lognberg had been expelled from the Social Democratic Party due to some disagreements, making the Union Party the joint biggest party of the Faroese parliament, along with the People's Party.

Electoral performance

Leaders 
Leaders of the Union Party:
Bárður á Steig Nielsen 2015—present
Kaj Leo Johannesen 2004–2015
Lisbeth L. Petersen 2001–2004
Edmund Joensen 1990–2001
Pauli Ellefsen 1974–1990
Trygvi Samuelsen 1970–1974
Johan Poulsen 1948–1970
Andrass Samuelsen 1924–1948
Oliver Effersøe 1917–1924
Fríðrikur Petersen 1906–1917

Current members of the Løgting 

As of the 2022 general snap election:

References

External links
Sambandsflokkurin official site

Conservative liberal parties
Liberal parties in Denmark
Nordic agrarian parties
Political parties in the Faroe Islands